Máximo Suniel was last municipal mayor of Cagayan de Misamis and the first city mayor of Cagayan de Oro from 1948 to 1953. When President Elpidio Quirino signed the charter of the city. He and the other municipal officials were there to witness the signing of the said charter.

Mayors of Cagayan de Oro